Krey is a surname. Notable people with the surname include:

August C. Krey (1887–1961), American medievalist
Laura Krey (1890–1985), American author
Philip Krey (born 1950), American Lutheran seminary president
Solveig Krey (born 1963), Norwegian naval officer

See also

Karey (disambiguation)